Wild Life and Christmas Belles is a 1958 Australian television revue. It was shown on New Year's Eve, running from 10:55pm until a few minutes before midnight. It was filmed in ABC's Melbourne studios but was shown in Sydney and Melbourne simultaneously. The cast included Barry Humphries, who played Mrs Norma Everage. The sketch had Mrs Everage enter a special model school for the "Lovely Mother" quest.

Cast
Syd Conabere		
Jennifer Eddy		
Barry Humphries
Bettine Kauffman	
Mary Hardy
Patricia Kennedy		
Peggy Marks		
Bambi Smith

Reception
The Age called it "sensational".

Response was positive enough to lead to another revue, Trip-Tease and High C's.

References

External links
 

Australian television films
Christmas television films
Films directed by William Sterling (director)